JBO is a heavy metal band from Erlangen, Germany. The band is most known for their parodies of rock and pop songs. The band has written more of its own songs since 2000, but continues to produce parodies, which they refer to as "Blöedsinn" – an intentional misspelling of "Blödsinn" which means "nonsense" or "stupidity" in German.

Cover versions and parodies

References 

J.B.O.